Olav Guttormson Kirkeluten (6 January 1904 – 24 June 1973) was a Norwegian politician for the Conservative Party.

He served as a deputy representative to the Parliament of Norway from Buskerud during the term 1954–1957. In total he met during 10 days of parliamentary session.

References

1904 births
1973 deaths
Conservative Party (Norway) politicians
Deputy members of the Storting
Buskerud politicians